Josef Pešice (12 February 1950 – 18 December 2017) was a Czech football player and manager.

As a player Pešice played for both famous Prague clubs, Sparta Prague and Slavia Prague. His largest success however came with Zbrojovka Brno, when he won the Czechoslovak First League with this team in the 1977/78 season.

As a manager Pešice led several Czech clubs before focusing on Czech Republic youth national teams. He was named the temporary head coach of the Czech Republic in September 2013 and won three out of three games (2 competitive and 1 friendly).

References

External links
  Profile at ČMFS website
  Profile at FC Zbrojovka Brno official website

1950 births
2017 deaths
Czech footballers
Czechoslovak expatriate footballers
Czechoslovak footballers
FC Zbrojovka Brno players
AC Sparta Prague players
SK Slavia Prague players
AEL Limassol players
Cypriot First Division players
Czech football managers
SK Slavia Prague managers
FK Teplice managers
FK Jablonec managers
Expatriate footballers in Cyprus
Czechoslovak expatriate sportspeople in Cyprus
Czech expatriate sportspeople in Cyprus
Expatriate football managers in Cyprus
Czech expatriate sportspeople in Costa Rica
Expatriate football managers in Costa Rica
Association football midfielders
Deaths from cancer in the Czech Republic
Deaths from stomach cancer
Footballers from Prague
Czech expatriate football managers